Ajagae was a military leader in the Sangju area during the waning years of Unified Silla who led a local rebellion which seized Sangju and is remembered primarily as the father of Gyeon Hwon, the founder and first king of Hubaekje. Some Gyeon family lineages therefore claim him as their progenitor, although he himself was of Yi descent. Ajagae was born and lived most of his life in Gaeun, in modern-day Mungyeong City, where he was a farmer. According to the Samguk Yusa, he was descended from King Jinheung of Silla, but clearly his branch of the family had lost its royal connection some time before.

Since there is no record of interactions between Ajagae and Gyeon Hwon during their later years, it is possible that Ajagae was not really Gyeon Hwon's father. The records of the Later Three Kingdoms period, however, are too sparse to permit any conclusive judgment. It is equally possible that the two men became estranged after Gyeon Hwon left home to join the Silla army.

Family
Ancestors:
King Jinheung of Silla (신라 진흥왕, 新羅 眞興王)
Lady Baeksung of the Buyeo clan (백숭부인 부여씨, 白崇婦人 扶餘氏); daughter of King Seong of Baekje (백제 성왕, 百濟 聖王) and wife of King Jinheung.
Gim Gu-ryun (김구륜, 金仇輪); King Jinheung and Lady Baeksung's son.
Pa Jin-chan, Duke Seonpum (파진찬 선품공, 波珍飡 善品公); King Munmu's queen consort, Queen Jaui's father.
Father: Gim Jak-jin (김작진, 金酌珍) – Duke Seonpum's descendant.
Mother: Lady Wanggyopari (왕교파리, 王咬巴里)
Wives and children:
 Lady Sangwon (상원부인, 上院夫人)
1st son Gyeon Hwon (견훤, 甄萱; 867–936)
2nd son Neung-ae (능애, 能哀; d. 936)
1st daughter Lady Daejudogeum (대주도금, 大主刀金)
Son-in-law: Ji-Hwon (지훤, 池萱) – they had 1 son, Jin-Ho (진호, 眞虎).
 Lady Namwon (남원부인, 南院夫人)
3rd son Yong-gae (용개, 龍蓋)
4th son Bo-gae (보개, 寶蓋)
5th son So-gae (소개, 小蓋)

References

Silla died

See also
History of Korea

Silla people
North Gyeongsang Province